Santa Bárbara is a parish in the municipality of Angra do Heroísmo on the island of Terceira in the Azores. It contains the localities As Nove, Canada da Nossa Senhora da Ajuda, Pico das Seis, Pico dos Enos and Santa Bárbara.

References

Freguesias of Angra do Heroísmo